Es Pontàs ("The big bridge" in Catalan language) is a natural arch in the southeastern part of the island of Mallorca. The arch is located on the coastline between the Cala Santanyí and Cala Llombards in the municipality of Santanyí. The arch measures approximately 13 meters high. One popular viewpoint with a view of Es Pontàs is Mirador Es Pontas.

Climbing
Es Pontàs is the focus of the 2007 film King Lines, featuring American climber Chris Sharma's first ascent of the hardest deep water solo climb in the world at that time, called :fr:Es Pontàs (voie d'escalade) graded . The route has since been repeated by Jernej Kruder, Jan Hojer and Jakob Schubert. There is no bridge connecting Es Pontàs to the Mollorca coastline. It is only accessible by boat or by swimming.

References

External links

Climbing routes
Rock formations of Spain
Natural arches
Landforms of the Balearic Islands